Lennart Rönnback (21 May 1905 – 4 November 2007) was a Finnish White Guard veteran of the Finnish Civil War of 1918. Rönnback died on 4 November 2007, at the age of 102.  He was considered the last White Guard veteran of the Finnish Civil War at the time of his death, but later Lauri Nurminen was discovered. See Last Red Guard and White Guard here.

External links
Lennart Rönnback obituary 

1905 births
2007 deaths
People of the Finnish Civil War (White side)
Finnish centenarians
Men centenarians